Manhunter (Mark Shaw) is a fictional character appearing in comic books published by DC Comics. He is depicted as an antihero within the DC Universe. He is the third featured character called Manhunter.

Mark Shaw appeared in the third season of the Arrowverse television series Arrow played by actor David Cubitt.

Fictional character biography

Mark Shaw was a public defender, unhappy about how easily criminals manipulated the system and got off without punishment. Shaw's uncle Desmond introduced him to an ancient sect of crime fighters called the Manhunters. Shaw contacted the Grand Master, the sect's leader, through a magical lion medallion. Shortly, he assumed the Manhunter name and costume from a previous Manhunter.

The Manhunter sect was composed of androids, created billions of years before by the Guardians of Oa to police the galaxy. For millennia, they served the Guardians well. The Manhunters became obsessed with the act of "hunting" criminals. Their code, "No Man Escapes the Manhunters", became more important to them than seeing justice done. Eventually, the androids rebelled against the Guardians, but were swiftly defeated by their creators. Those that survived went into hiding.

The latter-day Manhunters attempted to disgrace the Guardians with Mark Shaw at their side. They were opposed by the JLA, especially by League member Green Lantern. Shaw realized that he had been duped by the Manhunters and turned on them, killing the Grand Master, who was revealed to be a robot. Mark Shaw quickly returned as a new hero called the Privateer, but it was soon revealed that he was also working as a villain called the Star-Tsar, in league with the Key. The Red Tornado discovered this deception and Shaw went to prison.

While in the midst of serving his sentence, Shaw was offered the chance to accompany the Suicide Squad on a mission again as the Privateer and was released when the mission was completed. In the wake of the Millennium crisis, he donned a new costume to distance himself from the Manhunter cult and had his own adventures. Shaw now hunted costumed criminals for the bounty. He kept insisting that he was just operating for the money, but he kept finding himself doing the right thing.

Shaw continued working with the Suicide Squad, but left once again upon learning of a mission against Loa in New Orleans, LA.

During this time, he and his family were threatened by two shapeshifters named Dumas. Shaw killed Dumas I (Stephen Forrest Lee) and his battle with Dumas II (which also ended with the villain's death) led him to give up the Manhunter identity at the end of the last issue of Manhunter (vol. 2). It was later revealed that Shaw was actually himself both versions of Dumas and much of his history was actually the result of mental programming by the U.S. government.

Shaw joined the Shadow Fighters in order to battle the supervillan Eclipso. It was assumed that Mark Shaw was killed opposing Eclipso alongside his other team members in the Shadow Fighters. This was soon revealed not to be the case, however; he was actually undercover at the time he was facing Eclipso, masquerading as his old enemy Dumas at the behest of Sarge Steel. When the call went out for heroes to fight Eclipso, Sarge Steel believed that it would raise too many questions as to where Mark Shaw was if he did not answer the call and Sarge Steel sent along a ringer in Mark's place. The ringer thus only appeared once and is not known to have done anything but attack Eclipso and die as a result.

In Manhunter (vol. 3), featuring Kate Spencer in the title role, Mark Shaw was approached by the Order of Saint Dumas to take up the mantle of Azrael. At some point, it seems he refused, as Michael Washington Lane has now become the new Azrael.

In The New 52 (a 2011 reboot of the DC Comics universe), Mark Shaw appears in the Forever Evil storyline as a U.S. Marshal who is assigned to find Barbara Ann Minerva, a.k.a. the Cheetah. He is referred to as "one of the best manhunters" in the United States Marshal Service.

Head of Leviathan
Years alter, an older Shaw was revealed to be the head of Leviathan, having taken control of the organization from Talia al Ghul, assuming its name for himself and transforming it into a highly advanced espionage agency with the goal of taking over the world, which he thought was in chaos. He took on a goal of fixing the world, as he saw the constant struggle between heroes and villains, in addition to the governments 
making their secret maneuvers, as futile. 

In the Watchmen sequel Doomsday Clock, he accompanied Black Adam in his attack on the White House.

Leviathan Dawn
Afterwards, Shaw later pretended to ally with the Legion of Doom, stating to Lex Luthor that Lois Lane only revealed his identity because he wanted her to. While the superheroes and Legion of Doom were busy fighting, Shaw betrayed his allies as he saw people like Luthor a part of the problem with the world, teleporting the Legion away to a far off place instead of attacking the League or civilians. Sometime after the battle in Metropolis, Shaw presumably obliterated Dr. Netz for giving Leviathan's technology to Waller and decided to make moves as Shaw soon bought Markovia and appealed to everyone around the world for help in fixing the world.

In other media
Mark Shaw appears in the Arrowverse TV series. David Cubitt portrays Mark Shaw on Arrow. In the third-season episode "Corto Maltese", he is the liaison A.R.G.U.S. agent to Corto Maltese, who has gone off the grid and is unreachable. Lyla Michaels asks John Diggle to check-up on Shaw while he visits the island. Diggle finds Shaw who is in the midst of a critical undercover mission with a local cartel and offers him to help. Soon after, Shaw betrays him and steals an A.R.G.U.S. thumbdrive. Oliver Queen, Roy Harper and Diggle ambush the trade between Shaw and the cartel. After Diggle defeats him, Shaw claims Amanda Waller drove him to his insubordination. Shaw begged Diggle to tell Waller he killed Shaw so Shaw can go back to living a normal life. Diggle, knowing full well what Waller was capable of, knocked him out but agreed to do so. In "Al Sah-him", it is revealed that he became ally to H.I.V.E. and, under the orders from Damien Darhk, went to Corto Maltese to draw A.R.G.U.S. agents in order to obtain secret files.

Further reading

References

External links
 Manhunter (Mark Shaw) at DC Comics Wiki

Characters created by Jack Kirby
Comics characters introduced in 1970
DC Comics characters with accelerated healing
DC Comics martial artists
DC Comics titles
Fiction set in the 2070s
Fictional terrorists
Fictional lawyers
Suicide Squad members
Fictional criminals
Fictional soldiers